Ayyash or the variant Ayash or francicized Ayach and Ayache may refer to:

Places
 Ayyash, Iran, a village in Khuzestan Province, Iran
Ayaş, Ankara, pronounced Ayash, town in Turkey (pronounced Ayash)
Ayaş, Mersin, pronounced Ayash, coastal town in Mersin Province, Turkey
Ait Ayach, a commune in the Midelt Province of the Drâa-Tafilalet administrative region of Morocco

People

Ayach
Ramy Ayach (born 1980), Lebanese singer, composer, actor

Ayache
Alexandre Ayache (born 1982), French dressage rider
Ayache Belaoued (born 1984), Algerian football player
Nicholas Ayache (born 1958), French computer scientist and member of the French Academy of Sciences
Olivier Ayache-Vidal (born 1969), French film director and screenwriter
William Ayache (born 1961), French footballer and later manager

Ayash
Mohammed Ayash (born 1986), Yemeni football player 
Mohammed Emad Ayash (born 2001), Qatari football player

Ayyash
Ayyash Al-Haj Hussein Al-Jassim, a Syrian leader from Deir al-Zour city, who began the armed struggle against the French colonizers in governorate of Deir al-Zour in 1925 coinciding with the outbreak of the Great Syrian Revolution in Jabal al-Arab and Ghouta of Damascus
Ayyash ibn Abi Rabiah, one of the Islamic prophet Muhammad's companions 
Mohamed Sudqi Ayyash (born 1925), writer of the words for the Bahraini National Anthem Bahrainona used from Bahrain's independence in 1971 until 2002
Salim Ayyash (born 1963), a Hezbollah operative found guilty by the Special Tribunal fort Lebanon in the assassination of Lebanese Prime Minister Rafic Hariri 
 Yahya Ayyash, Palestinian, member of Hamas
Yasser Ayyash (born 1955), archbishop of the Melkite Greek Catholic Archeparchy of Petra and Philadelphia in Amman and later archbishop of the Melkite Greek Catholic Patriarchal Archeparchy of Jerusalem

Abi Ayyash
Aban ibn Abi Ayyash, a Persian companion of Sulaym ibn Qays and several Shia Imams

See also
Charge at Khan Ayash, incident occurring on 2 October 1918 north of Damascus after the pursuit to, and capture of Damascus